The 2010 San Diego State Aztecs football team represented San Diego State University in the 2010 NCAA Division I FBS football season. The team was coached by second-year head coach Brady Hoke and played their home games in Qualcomm Stadium in San Diego, California. They are members of the Mountain West Conference. They finished the season with a record of 9–4 (5–3 MWC) and a 35–14 victory over Navy in the Poinsettia Bowl.

Schedule

References

San Diego State
San Diego State Aztecs football seasons
Poinsettia Bowl champion seasons
San Diego State Aztecs football